The Alapaha River  is a  river in southern Georgia and northern Florida in the United States.  It is a tributary of the Suwannee River, which flows to the Gulf of Mexico.

History
The Hernando de Soto expedition narrative records mention a "Yupaha" village they encountered after they left Apalachee, "the sound of which is suggestive of the Alapaha, a tributary of the Suwanee."  Another reference to a village of "Atapaha" "so closely resembles Alapaha that it is reasonable to suppose they are the same, and that the town was on the river of that name." John Reed Swanton's landmark Indian Tribes of North America places the Indian village of Alapaha near where the Alapaha River met the Suwanee, and also noted that an Indian village of "Arapaja" was 70 leagues from St. Augustine, Florida, probably on the Alapaha River. The Spanish mission of Santa María de Los Angeles de Arapaha was located along the lower reaches of the river from before 1630 until 1656.

In the 1840s a German travel writer, Friedrich Gerstäcker wrote a dime novel called Alapaha, or the Renegades of the Border, giving the name to a noble Cherokee "squaw."  A translation of this novel was published in the 1870s as #67 in a series of American narratives published by Beadle.

During the American Civil War, the swamps along the Alapaha River in Berrien, Irwin, and Echols counties became a refuge for a number of gangs of Confederate deserters.

Course
The Alapaha River rises in southeastern Dooly County, Georgia, and flows generally southeastwardly through or along the boundaries of Crisp, Wilcox, Turner, Ben Hill, Irwin, Tift, Berrien, Atkinson, Lanier, Lowndes and Echols Counties in Georgia, and Hamilton County in Florida, where it flows into the Suwannee River 10 miles (16 km) southwest of Jasper.  Along its course it passes the Georgia towns of Rebecca, Alapaha, Willacoochee, Lakeland, and Statenville.

Near Willacoochee, Georgia, the Alapaha collects the Willacoochee River.  In Florida, it collects the Alapahoochee River and the short Little Alapaha River, which rises in Echols County, Georgia, and flows southwestward.

Intermittent river

The Alapaha River is an intermittent river for part of its course. During periods of low volume, the river disappears underground and becomes a subterranean river. It is a usually dry river bed with a number of sinkholes, including the Dead River Sink. During periods of low water flow, the Alapaha River downstream from the confluence of the Dead River and the Alapaha River flows upstream into the Dead River.

A few more miles downstream is a second sinkhole variously known as the Alapaha River Sink, Suck Hole, or the Devil's Den on the western bank of the river. At the latter point during the periods of low water flow, the Alapaha River disappears underground leaving a dry bank for much of the remainder of its course. The Alapaha River later reappears at the Alapaha River Rise, which is about a half mile upstream from the confluence of the Alapaha River and the Suwannee River .

Variant names 
The United States Board on Geographic Names settled on "Alapaha River" as the stream's name in 1891.  According to the Geographic Names Information System, it has also been known as:

Crossings

References

External links

 Columbia Gazetteer of North America entry
 DeLorme (2003).  Georgia Atlas & Gazetteer.  Yarmouth, Maine: DeLorme.  .
 
 
 Underground: The Alapaha River as an Intermittent River

Rivers of Florida
Rivers of Georgia (U.S. state)
Rivers of Dooly County, Georgia
Rivers of Crisp County, Georgia
Rivers of Wilcox County, Georgia
Rivers of Turner County, Georgia
Rivers of Ben Hill County, Georgia
Rivers of Irwin County, Georgia
Rivers of Tift County, Georgia
Rivers of Berrien County, Georgia
Rivers of Atkinson County, Georgia
Rivers of Lanier County, Georgia
Rivers of Lowndes County, Georgia
Rivers of Echols County, Georgia
Bodies of water of Hamilton County, Florida
Tributaries of the Suwannee River
Subterranean rivers of the United States